Avramov is a Bulgarian and Serbian surname. Notable people with the surname include:

Andrijana Avramov (born 1979), Serbian politician
Bogomil Avramov (born 1937), Bulgarian writer and poet
Georgi Avramov (born 1983), Bulgarian footballer
Nikola Avramov (1897–1945), Bulgarian painter
Smilja Avramov (1918–2018), Serbian academic, authority and educator in international law
Vlada Avramov (born 1979), Serbian footballer
Petar Avramov (born 1954), Bulgarian economist, businessman

See also
Avramović

Bulgarian-language surnames
Serbian surnames
Patronymic surnames
Surnames from given names